The FIS Nordic Junior and U23 World Ski Championships 2017 took place in Park City, United States from 30 January to 5 February 2017.  It was the 40th Junior World Championships and the 12th Under-23 World Championships in nordic skiing.

Schedule
All times are local (UTC-7).

Cross-country

Nordic combined

Ski jumping

Medal summary

Junior events

Cross-country skiing

Nordic combined

Ski jumping

Under-23 events

Cross-country skiing

Medal table

References

External links
Utah2017.com

2017
2017 in cross-country skiing
2017 in ski jumping
Junior World Ski Championships
2017 in sports in Utah
2017 in youth sport
International sports competitions hosted by the United States
January 2017 sports events in the United States
February 2017 sports events in the United States